The 2014 Florida State Seminoles baseball team represented Florida State University in the 2014 NCAA Division I baseball season. The Seminoles played their home games at Mike Martin Field at Dick Howser Stadium, named for 35th year head coach Mike Martin. It was the Seminoles' 23rd season as a member of the ACC and its 9th in the ACC Atlantic Division.

Florida State achieved forty wins for the thirty-seventh straight year and twenty conference wins for the seventh time in school history. The Seminoles made an appearance in the NCAA Tournament for the fifty-second time, their thirty-seventh straight tournament appearance. Florida State was chosen as a national seed for the tenth time and hosted a regional for the thirty-first time.

Personnel

Roster

Coaches

Schedule
The Seminoles played a three-game series against Miami, despite the ACC not scheduling conference games between the two schools.  The three games did not count in ACC standings.

Florida State was selected as the fifth overall seed in the NCAA tournament.

! style="" | Regular Season (41–14)
|- valign="top" 

|- bgcolor="#ddffdd"
| February 14 ||  || No. 5 || Dick Howser Stadium • Tallahassee, FL || W 13–2 || Weaver (1–0) || Schwartz (0–1) || None || 5,756 || 1–0 || —
|- bgcolor="#ddffdd"
| February 15 || Niagara || No. 5 ||  Dick Howser Stadium • Tallahassee, FL || W 4–1 || Leibrandt (1–0) || Fittry (0–1) || Winston (1) || 5,511 || 2–0 || —
|- bgcolor="#ddffdd"
| February 16 || Niagara || No. 5 || Dick Howser Stadium • Tallahassee, FL || W 13–08 || Compton (1–0) || Stroud (0–1) || None || 4,578 || 3–0 || —
|- bgcolor="#ddffdd"
| February 18 || at  || No. 5 || John Sessions Stadium • Jacksonville, FL || W 12–6 || Holtman (1–0) || Gordon (0–2) || None || 3,000 || 4–0 || —
|- bgcolor="#ddffdd"
| February 21 ||  || No. 5 || Dick Howser Stadium • Tallahassee, FL || W 8–3 || Weaver (2–0) || Lawlor (1–1) || None || 5,024 || 5–0 || —
|- bgcolor="#ddffdd"
| February 22 || Georgia || No. 5 || Dick Howser Stadium • Tallahassee, FL || W 10–4 || Smith (1–0) || Cheek (0–2) || None || 6,568 || 6–0 || —
|- bgcolor="#cccccc"
| February 23 || Georgia || No. 5 || Dick Howser Stadium • Tallahassee, FL || colspan=7 style="text-align:center"|Cancelled
|- bgcolor="#ffdddd"
| February 28 || No. 17  || No. 2 || Dick Howser Stadium  • Tallahassee, FL || L 1–3 || Diaz (3–0) || Weaver (2–1) || Garcia (3) || 5,599 || 6–1 || —
|-

|- bgcolor="#ddffdd"
| March 1 || No. 17 Miami (FL) || No. 2 || Dick Howser Stadium • Tallahassee, FL || W 10–2 || Leibrandt (2–0) || Radziewski (0–2) || None || 6,593 || 7–1 || —
|- bgcolor="#ddffdd"
| March 2 || No. 17 Miami (FL) || No. 2 || Dick Howser Stadium • Tallahassee, FL || W 13–6 || Smith (2–0) || Salcines (0–1) || None || 5,902 || 8–1 || —
|- bgcolor="#ddffdd"
| March 4 || at  || No. 2 || USF Baseball Stadium • Tampa, FL || W 5–1 || Miller (1–0) || Serrallonga (1–1) || None || 3,615 || 9–1 || —
|- bgcolor="#ddffdd"
| March 5 || at South Florida || No. 2 || USF Baseball Stadium • Tampa, FL || W 4–1 || Hotlmann (2–0) || Herget (2–2) || Winston (2) || 2,261 || 10–1 || —
|- bgcolor="#ddffdd"
| March 7 || Maryland || No. 2 || Dick Howser Stadium • Tallahassee, FL || W 15–3 || Weaver (3–1) || Stinnett (2–2) || None || 4,056 || 11–1 || 1–0
|- bgcolor="#ffdddd"
| March 8 || Maryland || No. 2 || Dick Howser Stadium • Tallahassee, FL || L 1–5 || Shawaryn (4–0) || Leibrandt (2–1) || None || 4,801 || 11–2 || 1–1
|- bgcolor="#ddffdd"
| March 9 || Maryland || No. 2 || Dick Howser Stadium • Tallahassee, FL || W 7–0 || Compton (2–0) || Price (1–2) || None || 4,059 || 12–2 || 2–1
|- bgcolor="#ddffdd"
| March 11 || at UCF || No. 2 || Jay Bergman Field • Orlando, FL || W 11–10 || Silva (1–0) || Thompson (0–3) || Winston (3) || 3,953 || 13–2 || —
|- bgcolor="#ddffdd"
| March 12 || at UCF || No. 2 || Jay Bergman Field • Orlando, FL || W 18–1 || Holtmann (3–0) || Martin (0–1) || None || 3,105 || 14–2 || —
|- bgcolor="#ddffdd"
| March 14 || No. 6  || No. 2 || Dick Howser Stadium • Tallahassee, FL || W 6–1 || Weaver (4–1) || Rodon (2–3) || None || 4,504 || 15–2 || 3–1
|- bgcolor="#ddffdd"
| March 15 || No. 6 NC State || No. 2 || Dick Howser Stadium • Tallahassee, FL || W 8–2 || Leibrandt (3–1) || Jernigan (3–1) || None || 5,481 || 16–2 || 4–1
|- bgcolor="#ddffdd"
| March 15 || No. 6 NC State || No. 2 || Dick Howser Stadium • Tallahassee, FL || W 9–813 || Burkhead (1–0) || Peterson (1–1) || None || 5,481 || 17–2 || 5–1
|- bgcolor="#ffdddd"
| March 18 || at Florida || No. 2 || Alfred A. McKethan Stadium • Gainesville, FL || L 1–3 || Rhodes (2–0) || Miller (1–1) || Poyner (1) || 5,657  || 17–3 || —
|- bgcolor="#ffdddd"
| March 21 || at No. 26 Clemson || No. 2 || Doug Kingsmore Stadium • Clemson, SC || L 3–9 || Gossett (2–0) || Weaver (4–2) || None || 4,948  || 17–4 || 5–2
|- bgcolor="#ddffdd"
| March 22 || at No. 26 Clemson || No. 2 || Doug Kingsmore Stadium • Clemson, SC || W 11–1 || Leibrandt (4–1) || Crownover (4–2) || None || 6,016 || 18–4 || 6–2
|- bgcolor="#ddffdd"
| March 22 || at No. 26 Clemson || No. 2 || Doug Kingsmore Stadium • Clemson, SC || W 4-3 || Smith (3–0) || Schmidt (2–4) || Winston (4) || 6,016 || 19–4 || 7–2
|- bgcolor="#ffdddd"
| March 25 || vs. Florida || No. 3 || Baseball Grounds of Jacksonville • Jacksonville, FL || L 1–4 || Young (3–0) || Miller (1–2) || Harris (4) || 10,125 || 19–5 || —
|- bgcolor="#ddffdd"
| March 28 || at  || No. 3 || Bill Beck Field (University of Rhode Island) • Kingston, RI || W 6–0 || Weaver (5–2) || Gorman (2–4) || None || 313 || 20–5 || 8–2
|- bgcolor="#ddffdd"
| March 28 || at Boston College || No. 3 || Bill Beck Field (University of Rhode Island) • Kingston, RI ||W 11–7 || Voyles (1–0) || Nicklas (1–2) || None || 178 || 21–5 || 9–2
|- bgcolor="#ddffdd"
| March 29 || at Boston College || No. 3 || Bill Beck Field (University of Rhode Island) • Kingston, RI || W 10–1 || Holtmann (4–0) || Burke (0–3) || Johnson (1) || 245 || 22–5 || 10–2
|-

|- bgcolor="#ddffdd"
| April 1 ||  || No. 4 || Dick Howser Stadium • Tallahassee, FL || W 8–3 || Smith (4–0) || Anderson (1–1) || None || 4,685 || 23–5 || —
|- bgcolor="#ddffdd"
| April 4 ||  || No. 4 || Dick Howser Stadium • Tallahassee, FL || W 8–712 || Blatch (1–0) || McCarty (1–6) || None || 5,678 || 24–5 || 11–2
|- bgcolor="#ddffdd"
| April 6 || Notre Dame || No. 4 || Dick Howser Stadium • Tallahassee, FL || W 11–2 || Compton (3–0) || Hearne (1–4) || None || 6,041 || 25–5 || 12-2
|- bgcolor="#ddffdd"
| April 6 || Notre Dame || No. 4 || Dick Howser Stadium • Tallahassee, FL || W 4–3 || Holtmann (5–0) || Connaughton (0–2) || Smith (1) || 6,041 || 26–5 || 13–2
|- bgcolor="#ffdddd"
| April 8 || No. 13 Florida || No. 2 || Dick Howser Stadium • Tallahassee, FL || L 0–8 || Young (4–0) || Strode (0–1) || None || 6,514 || 26–6 || —
|- bgcolor="#ffdddd"
| April 11 || at  || No. 2 || Russ Chandler Stadium • Atlanta, GA || L 3–5 || Heddinger (2–1) || Weaver (5–3) || Isaacs (3) || 2,681 || 26–7 || 13–3
|- bgcolor="#ffdddd"
| April 12 || at Georgia Tech || No. 2 || Russ Chandler Stadium • Atlanta, GA || L 4–12 || Stanton (3–1) || Compton (3–1) || None || 3,204 || 26–8 || 13–4
|- bgcolor="#ddffdd"
| April 13 || at Georgia Tech || No. 2 || Russ Chandler Stadium • Atlanta, GA || W 5–4 || Silva (2–0) || Clay (2–1) || Winston (5) || 3,288 || 27–8 || 14–4
|- bgcolor="#ddffdd"
| April 15 || Jacksonville || No. 7 || Dick Howser Stadium • Tallahassee, FL || W 6–1 || Miller (2–2) || Maxon (0–3) || None || 4,162 || 28–8 || —
|- bgcolor="#ddffdd"
| April 18 || at  || No. 7 || Gene Hooks Field • Winston-Salem, NC || W 7–1 || Weaver (6–3) || Fischer (4-4) || None || 1,684 || 29-8 || 15-4
|- bgcolor="#ddffdd"
| April 19 || at Wake Forest || No. 7 || Gene Hooks Field • Winston-Salem, NC || W 4–313 || Winston (1–0) || Kelly (1–1) || None || 953 || 30–8 || 16–4
|- bgcolor="#ffdddd"
| April 20 || at Wake Forest || No. 7 || Gene Hooks Field • Winston-Salem, NC || L 2–5 || McCarren (1–0) || Miller (2–3) || Kaden (1) || 851 || 30–9 || 16–5
|- bgcolor="#ddffdd"
| April 22 ||  || No. 6 || Dick Howser Stadium • Tallahassee, FL || W 4–0 || Strode (1–1) || Jordan (2–6) || None || 4,393 || 31–9 || —
|- bgcolor="#ddffdd"
| April 23 || Stetson || No. 6 || Dick Howser Stadium • Tallahassee, FL || W 13–3 || Silva (3–0) || Warmoth (1–3) || None || 4,040 || 32–9 || —
|- bgcolor="#ffdddd"
| April 25 || No. 2 Virginia || No. 6 || Dick Howser Stadium • Tallahassee, FL || L 3–510 || Mayberry (4–1) || Smith (4–1) || Howard (14) || 4,852 || 32–10 || 16–6
|- bgcolor="#ddffdd"
| April 26 || No. 2 Virginia || No. 6 || Dick Howser Stadium • Tallahassee, FL || W 7–0 || Compton (4–1) || Sborz (4–3) || None || 5,572 || 33–10 || 17–6
|- bgcolor="#ffdddd"
| April 27 || No. 2 Virginia || No. 6 || Dick Howser Stadium • Tallahassee, FL || L 3–4 || Waddell (6–2) || Holtmann (5–1) || Howard (15) || 4,791 || 33–11 || 17–7
|-

|- bgcolor="#ddffdd"
| May 3 ||  || No. 5 || Dick Howser Stadium • Tallahassee, FL || W 5–4 || Byrd (1–0) || Sawyer (3–4) || None || 5,196 || 34–11 || —
|- bgcolor="#ddffdd"
| May 3 || Minnesota || No. 5 || Dick Howser Stadium • Tallahassee, FL || W 3–2 || Compton (5–1) || Meyer (4–3) || Miller (1) || 5,196 || 35–11 || —
|- bgcolor="#ddffdd"
| May 4 || Minnesota || No. 5 || Dick Howser Stadium • Tallahassee, FL || W 7–1 || Silva (2–0) || Kunik (2–1) || None || 4,293 || 36–11 || —
|- bgcolor="#ddffdd"
| May 6 || at Stetson || No. 6 || Melching Field at Conrad Park • DeLand, FL || W 9–4 || Miller (3–3) || Jordan (2–7) || None || 2,883 || 37–11 || —
|- bgcolor="#ddffdd"
| May 9 || at  || No. 6 || Boshamer Stadium • Chapel Hill, NC || W 7–0 || Weaver (7–3) || Thornton (7–3) || None || 3,942 || 38–11 || 18–7
|- bgcolor="#ddffdd"
| May 10 || at North Carolina || No. 6 || Boshamer Stadium • Chapel Hill, NC || W 10–2 || Compton (6–1) || Kelley (1–2) || None || 3,039 || 39–11 || 19–7
|- bgcolor="#ffdddd"
| May 11 || at North Carolina || No. 6 || Boshamer Stadium • Chapel Hill, NC || L 4–5 || Hovis (7–1) || Smith (4–2) || None || 2,028 || 39–12 || 19–8
|- bgcolor="#ffdddd"
| May 13 || UCF || No. 6 || Dick Howser Stadium • Tallahassee, FL || L 3–8 || Howell (2–1) || Byrd (1–1) || None || 3,871 || 39–13 || —
|- bgcolor="#ddffdd"
| May 15 ||  || No. 6 || Dick Howser Stadium • Tallahassee, FL || W 3–0 || Weaver (8–3) || Istler (8–7) || Winston (6) || 4,326 || 40–13 || 20–8
|- bgcolor="#ddffdd"
| May 16 || Duke || No. 6 || Dick Howser Stadium • Tallahassee, FL || W 9–8 || Compton (7–1) || Van Orden (5–5) || Silva (1) || 4,595 || 41–13 || 21–8
|- bgcolor="#ffdddd"
| May 17 || Duke || No. 6 || Dick Howser Stadium • Tallahassee, FL || L 5–7 || Swart (5–2) || Miller (3–5) || None || 4,910 || 41–14 || 21–9
|-

|-
! style="" | Post-Season (2–3)
|- 

|- bgcolor="#ddffdd"
| May 21 || vs. (7)  || (2) No. 6 || NewBridge Bank Park • Greensboro, NC || W 7–1 || Strode (2–1) || Cherry (2–3) || None || 4,738 || 42–14 || 1–0
|- bgcolor="#ffdddd"
| May 23 || vs. (6) Maryland || (2) No. 6 || NewBridge Bank Park • Greensboro, NC || L 3–5 || Shawaryn (10–3) || Compton (7–2) || Mooney (11) || 3,531 || 42–15 || 1–1
|- bgcolor="#ddffdd"
| May 24 || vs. (3) No. 4 Virginia || (2) No. 6 || NewBridge Bank Park • Greensboro, NC || W 6–4 || Smith (5–2) || Sborz (4–4) || Winston (7) || 5,298 || 43–15 || 2–1
|-

|-
! style="" | NCAA Tournament (0–2)
|- 

|- bgcolor="#ffdddd"
| May 30 || (4)  || (1) No. 8 || Dick Howser Stadium • Tallahassee, FL || L 0–7 || Howard (7–6) || Compton (7–3) || None || 3,396 || 43–16 || 0–1
|- bgcolor="#ffdddd"
| May 31 || (2) Alabama || (1) No. 8 || Dick Howser Stadium • Tallahassee, FL || L 5–6 || Kamplain (7–3) || Weaver (8–4) || Burrows (11) || 3,586 || 43–17 || 0–2
|-

|-
| style="font-size:88%" | Legend:       = Win       = Loss       = PostponementBold = Florida State team member
|-
| style="font-size:88%" | Rankings from Collegiate Baseball poll. Parenthesis indicate tournament seedings.

Rankings

Awards

Watchlists
 Golden Spikes Award
D. J. Stewart
Luke Weaver

Semifinalists
 Dick Howser Trophy
D. J. Stewart

 Golden Spikes Award
D. J. Stewart
 ACC Player of the Year
D. J. Stewart

All-Americans

D. J. Stewart
Luke Weaver
All-ACC Selections
John Nogowski (First Team)
D. J. Stewart (First Team)
Luke Weaver (First Team)
Jose Brizuela (First Team)
Josh Delph (Third Team)
Gage Smith (Third Team)

MLB Draft
Eight players were selected in the 2014 MLB Draft:

References

External links
 Official website
 Media Guide

Florida State Seminoles baseball seasons
Florida State Seminoles
Florida State Seminoles baseball
Florida State